Libra is the name of different fictional characters appearing in American comic books published by Marvel Comics.

Publication history
The original Libra first appeared in Avengers #72 (Jan. 1970), and was created by Roy Thomas and Sal Buscema.

The character subsequently appears in:
 The Avengers #80–82 (Sept.–Nov. 1970),
 Daredevil #69 (Oct. 1970),
 Iron Man #33–36 (Jan.–April 1971),
 Daredevil #73 (Feb. 1971),
 The Avengers #120–125 (Feb.–July 1974), #130–134 (Dec. 1974–April 1975),
 Giant-Size Avengers #3 (Feb. 1975),
 The Avengers #135 (May 1975),
 Giant-Size Avengers #4 (June 1975),
 Iron Man #184–185 (July–Aug. 1984),
 The West Coast Avengers vol. 2 #26 (Nov. 1987),
 Avengers Forever #1–12 (Dec. 1998–Feb. 2000).

Libra appeared as part of the "Zodiac" entry in The Official Handbook of the Marvel Universe Deluxe Edition #20.

Fictional character biography

Gustav Brandt

German soldier Gustav Brandt served with the French forces during the Vietnam War. While in Saigon, he met and fell in love with a Vietnamese woman named Lua, and eventually had a daughter with her. However, Lua's brother Khruul was enraged with the interracial coupling of his sister and a European man. He and his men attacked Gustav and his family with flamethrowers. Lua was killed in the ensuing battle, and Gustav lost his eyesight. He and his daughter took shelter in Pama, where he was trained by the priests, but was forbidden to communicate with his daughter.

Joining the Zodiac Cartel, Gustav adopted the codename Libra, and served as a terrorist. The Zodiac was infiltrated by Nick Fury, posing as Scorpio; the Zodiac fought the Avengers and escaped. Led by Taurus, the Zodiac later attempted to kill all Manhattan residents born under the sign of Gemini as a show of power, but were thwarted by the Avengers. Taurus's faction attempted to kill the Zodiac dissident faction, but all twelve leaders were captured by the Avengers. Battling the Avengers on several occasions, he eventually discovered that Mantis was the daughter he had left in Pama, and turned himself in to the authorities. He then vanished mysteriously, later turning up in Ho Chi Minh City, where the Swordsman revealed to everyone Mantis' transformation into the Celestial Madonna. Libra then witnessed the marriage of Mantis and the Swordsman, and returned to prison shortly after. He did not stay in prison long, though, as he escaped and committed illegal acts alongside the Zodiac once more. A new android version of the Zodiac later appeared, led by Scorpio in a new android body, massacred the human Zodiac, and took over their criminal operations.

After the Zodiac's death at the hands of a Life Model Decoy, Libra – now defining himself by his interest in the balance rather than continuing his criminal past – served alongside the Avengers briefly as they battled Kang and Immortus in the Destiny War. His ability to sense the 'balance' of the universe helped Rick Jones use the Destiny Force to summon seven Avengers from different points in the team's history who would be crucial to their victory in the current crisis; these included Captain America from his battle with the Secret Empire, Yellowjacket while unbalanced and amnesic, Hawkeye just after the Kree-Skrull War, Giant-Man and Wasp of the present, Genis-Vell of a few months in the future, and Songbird from an alternate universe. Although they appeared strange choices, each Avenger was selected from these particular moments in time thanks to Libra's subconscious awareness of the universal balance and the necessity of their future actions even when he was unaware of their roles, comparing his subconscious decision to being able to balance on a tightrope without being able to explain how to do so. He realised the purpose behind their selection in the final confrontation, even acknowledging that Hawkeye's presence affected his own decisions as he decided to participate in the final fight rather than just watch from the sidelines.

Android Zodiac
Scorpio (Jake Fury) constructed the android Zodiac members, although his plan was thwarted by the Defenders. The androids Libra and Sagittarius employed costumed criminals posing as the Defenders to create chaos in New York City. Quicksilver employed the android Zodiac to attack the West Coast Avengers, but the Avengers defeated the Zodiac.

Led by Scorpio in a new android body, the android Zodiac massacred the human Zodiac, and took over their criminal operations. They battled the West Coast Avengers, but were rendered inert when they were transported to the dimension of the Brotherhood of the Ankh.

Thanos' Libra
The third Libra is an unnamed female that Thanos recruited to join his incarnation of the Zodiac. She and the other Zodiac members perish when Thanos abandons them on the self-destructing Helicarrier where Cancer was the only survivor.

Powers and abilities
Libra is physically blind, but possesses psychic senses, and is also a skilled martial artist. He has the ability to shift into the Place Between Places, a mystical dimension that is untraceable to most life-forms.

The Android Libra can fly and become intangible. In its second form, Libra can still fly but demonstrated no other powers.

Ecliptic's Libra wielded a staff and an energy-charged sword. It is unknown if she possesses other abilities, but she possesses the Zodiac teleportation device.

In other media
Libra appears in The Avengers: United They Stand animated television series. This version is a female alien who wields a weighing scale-like weapon and serves as a member of Zodiac.

References

External links
 
 

Characters created by Roy Thomas
Characters created by Sal Buscema
Comics characters introduced in 1970
Fictional blind characters
Fictional henchmen
Fictional Vietnam War veterans
Marvel Comics martial artists
Marvel Comics supervillains